Infurcitinea albicomella is a species of moth belonging to the family Tineidae.

It is native to Europe.

References

Meessiinae
Moths described in 1851
Taxa named by Henry Tibbats Stainton